Osiek  is a village in Brodnica County, Kuyavian-Pomeranian Voivodeship, in north-central Poland. It is the seat of the gmina (administrative district) called Gmina Osiek.

The village has a population of 990.

References

Osiek